Blue Demon and Zovek in the Invasion of the Dead (Spanish: Blue Demon y Zovek en la invasión de los muertos) is a 1973 Mexican horror film directed by René Cardona, starring Blue Demon (Alejandro Muñoz Moreno) and Professor Zovek (Francisco Xavier Chapa del Bosque).

Zovek died during production, and wrestler Blue Demon was brought in to bring the film up to feature length.

Plot
Professor Bruno Volpi discovers some strange markings on a cliff. Professor Zovek deciphers them to warn of impending catastrophe. Wrestler Blue Demon and Zovek battle zombies.

Cast 
 Blue Demon as himself
 Professor Zovek as himself
 Christa Linder as Erika
 Raúl Ramírez as Professor Bruno Volpi

References

External links 
 
Review by D. Wilt
2014 review

1970s Mexican films
1970s Spanish-language films
Films directed by René Cardona